Xanthorrhoea acanthostachya is a species of grasstree of the genus Xanthorrhoea native to Western Australia.

Description
It blooms between August and December producing cream-white flowers.

Classification
The species was first formally described by the botanist David Bedford in 1985 as part of the work Xanthorrhoea acanthostachya (Xanthorrhoeaceae), a new species of the Perth region, Western Australia'' as published in the journal Nuytsia.

Distribution
It has a scattered distribution along the west coast in the Wheatbelt, Peel and South West regions of Western Australia. It extends from Coorow in the north to Capel in the south where it grows in sandy soils with lateritic gravel.

References

Asparagales of Australia
acanthostachya
Angiosperms of Western Australia
Plants described in 1985
Endemic flora of Southwest Australia